Concord is a town in Cleburne County, Arkansas, United States. The population was 244 at the 2010 census.

Geography
Concord is located near the northeast corner of Cleburne County at  (35.664263, -91.845948). Arkansas Highway 25 passes through the town, leading southwest  to Heber Springs, the county seat, and northeast  to Batesville.

Demographics

As of the census of 2000, there were 255 people, 106 households, and 78 families residing in the town.  The population density was 34.8/km2 (90.1/mi2).  There were 119 housing units at an average density of 16.2/km2 (42.1/mi2).  The racial makeup of the town was 98.82% White, 0.78% Native American, and 0.39% from two or more races.  1.96% of the population were Hispanic or Latino of any race.

There were 106 households, out of which 30.2% had children from family members under the age of 18 living with them, 62.3% were living together, 9.4% had a female householder with no husband present, and 26.4% were non-families. 24.5% of all households were made up of individuals, and 14.2% had someone living alone who was 65 years of age or older.  The average household size was 2.41 and the average family size was 2.88.

In the town, the population was spread out, with 23.1% under the age of 18, 5.5% from 18 to 24, 25.5% from 25 to 44, 27.8% from 45 to 64, and 18.0% who were 65 years of age or older.  The median age was 42 years. For every 100 females, there were 102.4 males.  For every 100 females age 18 and over, there were 92.2 males.

The median income for a household in the town was $29,844, and the median income for a family was $35,625. Males had a median income of $27,708 versus $8,906 for females. The per capita income for the town was $13,283.13.  About 9.3% of families and 13.1% of the population were below the poverty line, including 15.6% of those under the age of 18 and 12.8% of those 65 or over. 78% of the population receive TANF.

Education 
Public education of early childhood, elementary and secondary school students is primarily provided by the Concord School District, which leads to graduation from Concord High School. The school mascot is the Pirate with purple and gold serving as the school colors.

References

Towns in Cleburne County, Arkansas
Towns in Arkansas